Eilema tardenota is a moth of the subfamily Arctiinae. It was described by Hervé de Toulgoët in 1971. It is found on the island of Madagascar.

References

 

tardenota
Moths described in 1971